This is a list of dishes found in Malaysian cuisine. Most dishes found in Malaysia are influenced by the cuisines of Indonesia and Singapore due to geographical proximities.

Staple foods

Main dishes

Soups

Breads

Salads

Noodle dishes

Rice dishes

Snacks

Preserved meat

Desserts

Spreads

Condiments and sauces

Cakes and pastries

Drinks

See also

 Malaysian cuisine

References

External links

 

Dishes
Lists of foods by nationality